Eugeny Vladimirovich Pchelov (born 1 September 1971) is a Russian specialist in history, heraldry and genealogy. He has published several monographs on the history, such as Rurikides. History of dynasty (2001), Romanov. History of dynasty (2001), Old Russian princely genealogy (2001), State symbols of Russia: Coat of Arms, Flag, Anthem (2007) and others.

List of works (Russian) 
 Правители России от Юрия Долгорукого до наших дней.- М.,2000 (совм. с В.Т.Чумаковым)
 Два века русской буквы Ё. История и словарь.- М.,2000 (совм. с В.Т.Чумаковым)
 Романовы. История династии.- М.,2001
 Рюриковичи. История династии.- М.,2001
 Генеалогия древнерусских князей IX- нач. XI.- М.,2001
 Генеалогия Романовых. 1613-2001.- М.,2001
 История России с древнейших времён до кон. XVI в. Учебник для 6 кл. основной школы.- М.,2001
 История России, XVII-XVIII вв. Учебник для 7 кл. основной школы.- М.,2002
 Князья и княгини Русской земли IX-XVI вв.- М.,2002 (совм. с В.Б. Перхавко и Ю.В. Сухаревым)
 Монархи России.- М.,2003
 Российский государственный герб: композиция, стилистика и семантика в историческом контексте- М.,2005
 Елена Ивановна Каменцева. Биобиблиографический указатель.- М., 2006 (в соавт.)
 Вячеслав Всеволодович Иванов / РАН. Материалы к биобиблиографии учёных.- М., 2007 (в соавт.)
 Государственные символы России: герб, флаг, гимн. Учебное пособие для старших классов.- М., 2007
 Кабардинская земля в царском титуле и русской государственной геральдике XVI-начала XX века.- Нальчик, 2007
 Сост., вступ. ст. и коммент.: Родословная гениальности: Из истории отечественной науки 1920-х гг.- М., 2008
 Рюрик / Жизнь замечательных людей. Вып. 1477 (1277). М.: Молодая гвардия, 2010. 316 с., ил.
 Экслибрисы и штемпели на книгах Научной библиотеки РГГУ. М., 2010. 440 с., ил.
 Правители России от Рюрика до наших дней. М.: Махаон, Азбука-Аттикус, 2011. 320 с., ил. (в соавт.)
 Бестиарий Московского царства: животные в эмблематике Московской Руси конца XV – XVII вв. / Отв. ред. акад. РАН Вяч. Вс. Иванов. М.: Старая Басманная, 2011. 204 с., ил.
 История России с древнейших времён до конца XVI века. Учебник для 6 кл. общеобразовательных учреждений / Рекомендовано Министерством образования и науки РФ. М.: «Русское слово», 2012. 264 с., ил.
 История Рюриковичей. М., 2012. 384 с., ил.
 Рюрик и начало Руси. М., 2012. 60 с.
 История России. XVII–XVIII века. Учебник для 7 кл. общеобразовательных учреждений / Рекомендовано Министерством образования и науки РФ. М.: «Русское слово», 2012. 240 с., ил.
 Романовы. История великой династии. М., 2013. 400 с., ил.
 История России с древнейших времён до начала XVI века. Учебник для 6 класса общеобразовательных организаций. М.: «Русское слово», 2015. 240 с., ил. (соавт.: П. В. Лукин)
 История России. XVI–XVII века. Учебник для 7 класса общеобразовательных организаций. М.: «Русское слово», 2015. 224 с., ил. (соавт.: П. В. Лукин)
 История России. XVIII век. Учебник для 8 класса общеобразовательных организаций. М.: «Русское слово», 2015. 232 с., ил. (соавт.: В. Н. Захаров)
 Рюриковичи: история и генеалогия. М.: Академический проект, 2016. 583 с.
 Династия Романовых / ГИМ. М., 2017. 184 с., ил.
 Авт.-сост.: Хрестоматия к учебнику Е. В. Пчелова, П. В. Лукина «История России с древнейших времён до начала XVI века» для 6 класса общеобразовательных организаций. М.: «Русское слово», 2017. 128 с.
 Романовы: история и генеалогия. М.: Академический проект, 2017. 442 с.
 Олег Вещий / Жизнь замечательных людей. Вып. 1899 (1699). М.: Молодая гвардия, 2018. 261 с., ил.
 Династия Рюриковичей / ГИМ. М., 2018. 148 с., ил.
 Герб России / ГИМ. М., 2018. 100 с., ил.
 Гербы российских кавалеров в гербовниках датских королевских орденов. М., 2020. 224 с., ил. (совм. с И. М. Афонасенко).
 Герб России XV–XVII вв.: европейский взгляд на географических картах. М., 2020. 88 с., ил.
 Сост.: Елена Ивановна Каменцева: Материалы к биографии / РГГУ. М., 2020. 106 с.: ил.
 Дамский век русской истории / ГИМ. М., 2020. 152 с., ил.
 Цареубийство 1918 года: источники, вопросы, версии / РГГУ. М.: РГГУ, 2020. 192 с.
 Символы времени в истории культуры: от Пуссена до метро. М., 2021. 104 с.: ил.

External links 
 Biography on Russian State University for the Humanities' website

Sources 

Historians of Russia
1971 births
Living people
Russian genealogists
Russian State University for the Humanities alumni